The Rock n' Roll Cops, also known as Rock n' Roll Cops 2: The Adventure Begins, is a 2003 martial arts action film directed by Scott Shaw. The film stars Scott Shaw, Kevin Eastman, Julie Strain, Robert Z'Dar and William Smith.  The film was co-produced by Donald G. Jackson who also plays a small role in the movie.

Plot
"The plot is pretty straightforward. A couple of cops (Scott Shaw and David Heavener) are trying to discover who Mr Big is. They also enjoy the police brutality. It turns out that one of the cops is in tight with Mr Big. Eventually they end up discovering that Mr Big is a guy named Rinaldi (long-time Hollywood actor William Smith), who is a friend of the police Commissioner (Donald G. Jackson)." Julie Strain plays a fortune teller in this film.

Zen Filmmaking
This feature film is considered a Zen Film in that it was created in the distinct style of filmmaking created by Scott Shaw, known as Zen Filmmaking.  In this style of filmmaking no scripts are used.

Distribution
The DVD release of this film is titled The Rock n' Roll Cops, whereas the VHS/video tape release of this film has the title Rock n' Roll Cops 2: The Adventure Begins.

References

External links 
 The Rock n' Roll Cops Official Website
 

2003 films
2000s English-language films
Films directed by Scott Shaw